Montenegrin men's handball clubs are participating in the EHF competitions since the season 1995/96. 

First team which ever competed at the European cups was Mornar Bar and most successful Montenegrin represent in the European competitions is Lovćen Cetinje. The other Montenegrin clubs which competed at the EHF competitions are Berane, Rudar Pljevlja, Budućnost Podgorica, Sutjeska Nikšić, Mojkovac, Partizan Tivat and Budvanska rivijera Budva.

The greatest result in the European cups made RK Lovćen during the season 2000/01. As a champion of FR Yugoslavia, Lovćen won fifth place in the EHF Champions League.

Results by season

Scores by teams

{|  class="wikitable sortable" 
!width="190"|Club
!width="20"|S
!width="20"|G
!width="20"|W
!width="20"|D
!width="20"|L
!GD
!width="20"|Pts
|-
|Lovćen Cetinje
|align = "center"|20
|align = "center"| 73
|align = "center"| 27
|align = "center"| 4
|align = "center"| 42
|align = "center"| 1860:1984
|align = "center"| 56
|-
|Berane
|align = "center"|4
|align = "center"| 16
|align = "center"| 10
|align = "center"| 0
|align = "center"| 6
|align = "center"| 459:453
|align = "center"| 20
|-
|Budućnost Podgorica
|align = "center"|2
|align = "center"| 16
|align = "center"| 9
|align = "center"| 2
|align = "center"| 5
|align = "center"| 483:450
|align = "center"| 20
|-
|Sutjeska Nikšić
|align = "center"|5
|align = "center"| 14
|align = "center"| 3
|align = "center"| 2
|align = "center"| 9
|align = "center"| 323:372
|align = "center"| 11
|-
|Mornar Bar
|align = "center"|4
|align = "center"| 10
|align = "center"| 4
|align = "center"| 0
|align = "center"| 6
|align = "center"| 282:280
|align = "center"| 8
|-
|Mojkovac
|align = "center"|4
|align = "center"| 10
|align = "center"| 3
|align = "center"| 0
|align = "center"| 7
|align = "center"| 200:274
|align = "center"| 6
|-
|Partizan Tivat
|align = "center"|3
|align = "center"| 8
|align = "center"| 1
|align = "center"| 3
|align = "center"| 4
|align = "center"| 187:231
|align = "center"| 5
|-
|Rudar Pljevlja
|align = "center"|1
|align = "center"| 4
|align = "center"| 2
|align = "center"| 0
|align = "center"| 2
|align = "center"| 97:114
|align = "center"| 4
|-
|Budvanska rivijera Budva
|align = "center"|3
|align = "center"| 6
|align = "center"| 0
|align = "center"| 0
|align = "center"| 6
|align = "center"| 135:171
|align = "center"| 0
|-
|Jedinstvo Bijelo Polje
|align = "center"|1
|align = "center"| 2
|align = "center"| 0
|align = "center"| 0
|align = "center"| 2
|align = "center"| 46:73
|align = "center"| 0
|- class="sortbottom"
|align = "center"|10 TEAMS
|align = "center"| 
|align = "center"| 159
|align = "center"| 59
|align = "center"| 11
|align = "center"| 89
|align = "center"| 4072:4402
|align = "center"| 129
|}

S - seasons; G - games; W - wins; D - draws; L - losses; GD - goal difference; Pts - points (win = 2pts; draw = 1)

Opponents by countries

In the European competitions, Montenegrin clubs played against clubs from various 30 countries.

Table not including four mutual games between Montenegrin clubs.

See also 
 Montenegrin First League of Men's Handball
 Montenegrin Handball League Records
 Montenegrin Second League of Men's Handball
 Montenegrin Men's Handball Cup
 Montenegrin First League of Women's Handball
 Montenegrin women's handball clubs in European competitions

External links 
European Handball Federation
Handball Federation of Montenegro
 

Handball in Montenegro
Montenegrin handball clubs